Neel Akasher Neechey (Bengali: নীল আকাশের নীচে Nil akasher niche, "Under the Blue Sky") is a 1958 Bengali language drama film directed by Mrinal Sen and produced by Hemanta Mukherjee, starring Kali Bannerjee, Manju Dey, Bikash Roy in lead roles. The film was based on a short story Chini Feriwala of Mahadevi Verma.

Set in the background of the last days of the British Raj in Calcutta, the film explores the lives of a number of characters, including the platonic relationship between an immigrant Chinese wage worker, Wang Lu, and the main female character Basanti. The film had overt political overtones and was the first film to be banned by the Government of India. The ban was effective for two months.

Plot
Set in the 1930s, the film tells the story of an honest Chinese hawker, Wang Lu, who sells silk in Calcutta's streets while refusing to get involved in the opium trade run by his fellow countrymen. He feels a sisterly affection towards Basanti, the wife of a lawyer who's engaged in a nationalist political group. Basanti is arrested and imprisoned causing Wang Lu to get involved with her political group. He later returns to China to join the resistance movement against the Japanese invasion of China in 1931.

Cast
 Kali Bannerjee as Wang Lu
 Manju Dey as Basanti
 Bikash Roy as Basanti's husband
 Smriti Biswas as Maki
 Suruchi Sengupta
 Ajit Chatterjee
 Rasaraj Chakraborthy
 Mei-Lin Jiang(1936-2006) as Mei-Lin in special appearance.

Soundtrack

References

External links

 

1958 films
1958 drama films
Bengali-language Indian films
Indian drama films
Films directed by Mrinal Sen
Films set in Kolkata
Censored films
Film censorship in India
Film controversies in India
Films set in the British Raj
1950s Bengali-language films
Films based on Indian novels